"Start All Over" is a song by Miley Cyrus

Start All Over may also refer to:

"Start All Over", a 1957 song by Lee Emerson, covered by Bob Gallion